Don Ruter Nanayakkara (15 March 1915 – 4 January 1989) was a Sri Lankan actor in Sri Lankan cinema as well as in British drama. Playing lanky villains and comedic characters, Nanayakkara gained popularity in movies like Rekava, Kurulu Bedda and Sikuru Tharuwa. He also appeared in Steven Spielberg's Oscar winning movie Indiana Jones and the Temple of Doom.

Personal life
He was born on 15 March 1915 in Kolonnawa, Sri Lanka. His father Don Diyas Nanayakkara was from Kolonnawa. His mother Nonno Caldera was from Gothatuwa. He attended the Kolonnawa Govt. School and St. Matthew's College, Dematagoda. Starting as a child, he was drawn to music and learned to play the Japanese mandolin.

He was married to Adeline Perera whom he met while performing the play. He went to the Pagoda Hotel in Fort where she worked and presented his proposal. In 1945 he married Adeline. They had six children: daughters – Asoka, Shanthi, Sirima and Kalyani and sons – Dilip and Ranjith. Adeline died on March 10, 1983.

He has died by not eating food properly. His organs had become weak.

Career
As a young adult, Nanayakkara showed interest in theater and became a regular attender of stage plays. At one such drama around 1936, he was noticed by playwright Sirisena Wimalaweera who took him into his troupe of players. Later he was chosen to play the role of 'Saranapala' in the play Amma. Beginning with Amma, Nanayakkara appeared in many of Wimalweera's plays; these include Seedevi, Pitisara Kella, Rodi Kella and Maggona Charlie.

Nanayakkara debut in film came when Wimalaweera adapted Amma into a motion picture in 1949, two years after the release of the first major Sinhalese film Kadawunu Poronduwa. Nanayakkara dabbled as a vocalist in Wimalaweera's films singing two songs for Amma. He continued to appear in Wimalaweera's movies up to Wimalaweera's death in 1963.

Nanayakkara's had one of his most celebrated performances in Rekawa (1956) which is considered a landmark in film. He appeared in the critically acclaimed role of Sooty, the protagonist's father who is a thief and attempts to use his son's supposed healing powers to gain wealth causing a death and his son's condemnation by the whole villages.

Nanayakkara continued his celebrated villainous roles in Kurulu Bedda (1961), Sikuru Tharuwa (1966) and Binaramali (1969). He won the Sarasaviya Best Actor Award for his role in Bicycle Hora in 1968.  In 1984, Nanayakkara was chosen as one of the Sri Lankan actors in Indiana Jones and the Temple of Doom. In the movie he played the village headsman.

In Kathuru Muwath (1971) he played the lead role of the Kathuru Muwath. He had major roles in many of K.A.W. Perera's other films like Kapatikama (1966), Duleeka (1974), Lasanda (1974) and Nedeyo (1976),. Working with Lester James Peries again in Baddegama (1981) he played another major negative role as the Medicine Man.

Other film appearances include Chandiya (1965), Parasathumal (1966), Ahasin Polawata (1978), Siribo Aiya (1980) and Dese Mal Pipila. Nanayakkara's last film Ahas Maliga was screened five years after his death.

Filmography

Film

References

External links

D.R.Nanayakkara in Sinhala Cinema Database
D R Nanayakkara - ඩී ආර් නානායක්කාර 's song - Listen on-line at Siyapath Arana.com

1915 births
1989 deaths
Sri Lankan male film actors
Sinhalese male actors
Date of death missing
Place of birth missing
People from Colombo
20th-century Sri Lankan male actors